A corsair is a privateer or pirate, especially:

 Barbary corsair, Ottoman and Berber pirates and privateers operating from North Africa
 French corsairs, privateers operating on behalf of the French crown

Corsair may also refer to:

Arts and entertainment

Comic Books
 Corsair, a Marvel Comics character, a “space pirate” and the father of X-Men superheroes Cyclops and Havok

Novels 
 Corsair, a nautical historical novel by Dudley Pope, published in 1987
 Corsair (Bunch novel), a 2001 fantasy novel by Chris Bunch
 Corsair (Cussler novel), a 2009 adventure novel by Clive Cussler

Music 
 "Le Corsaire" Overture by Hector Berlioz Op. 21
 The Corsairs, a 1960s doo-wop group
 "Corsair", a song  on the 2002 album Geogaddi by Boards of Canada
 "Corsair", a 2007 song from the EP Voyage by In Fear and Faith

Video games 
 Corsairs: Conquest at Sea, a 1999 game by Microïds
 Corsairs (Freelancer), a fictional criminal organization in Freelancer
 Corsair, an evolution to the Gambler class in Final Fantasy XI: Treasures of Aht Urhgan
 The Corsair, a persona in the Assassin's Creed: Revelations multiplayer game
 Corsair class in Black Desert Online
 Drake Corsair, a flyable star ship in Star Citizen

Other arts and entertainment 
 The Corsair, an 1814 poem by Lord Byron
 Corsair (comics), a fictional character in the Marvel Comics universe
 Corsair (film), a 1931 American gangster film

Companies 
 Corsair Gaming (formerly Corsair Components), an American computer peripherals and hardware company
 Corsair International (formerly Corsairfly and Corsair), a French airline
 Corsair Marine, a builder of trimaran sailboats
 Corsair, an imprint of publisher Constable & Robinson

Military 
 Vought F4U Corsair, a US Navy World War II and Korean War fighter aircraft
 Vought SBU Corsair, a US Navy biplane dive bomber first flown in 1933
 Vought O4U Corsair, two different experimental biplane scout-observation aircraft, neither of which entered regular service 
 LTV A-7 Corsair II, a US Navy and later US Air Force jet attack aircraft
 O2U Corsair, a US Navy biplane scout and observation aircraft
 Corsair, a subclass of the Tench-class submarine, a US Navy World War II class
 , a US Navy submarine
 USS Corsair (SP-159), a private steam yacht briefly chartered by the US Navy in World War I

Transportation

Air
 Cessna 425, a light aircraft originally known as Corsair
 Corsair International, a French airline subsidiary of the TUI Group
 Corsair (G-ADVB), a Short Empire flying boat flown by Imperial Airways and BOAC

Land
 Edsel Corsair, an American automobile of the late fifties
 Ford Corsair, a British car model of the late 1960s, and an Australian model of the late 1980s
 Corsair motorcycle, built by Cotton
 Corsair, a GWR Bogie Class broad gauge locomotive that was built for and run on the Great Western Railway between 1849 and 1873
 Corsair, locomotive No. 3037 of the GWR 3031 Class that was built for and run on the Great Western Railway between 1894 and 1908
 Lincoln Corsair, a compact American crossover
Phantom Corsair, a prototype two-door sedan built in 1938

Sea
 Corsair I, a yacht built by William Cramp and Sons for Charles J. Osborn and bought by J. P. Morgan in 1882
 Corsair II, a yacht built for J. P. Morgan in 1891, which served as  during the Spanish–American War
 Corsair III, a yacht built in 1898 for J. P. Morgan (the last he owned), that served the US Navy in World Wars I and II, in the latter as USS Oceanographer
 Corsair IV, a yacht built for J. P. Morgan Jr. in 1930, the largest built in the United States
 Corsair (dinghy), a class of sixteen-foot three-handed sailing dinghies

Other uses 
 Corsair (Novell), a former operating system and user interface project for NetWare
 Corsair Bay, a bay located in Lyttelton Harbour, Canterbury New Zealand
 The Corsair (Santa Monica College newspaper), the student newspaper of Santa Monica College, California
 The Corsair (Pensacola State College newspaper), the student newspaper of Pensacola State College, Florida

See also
 Corsaire (disambiguation)
 Corsaren (The Corsair), a 19th-century Danish satirical and political weekly magazine
 Korsaren (The Corsair), a late 19th-century/early 20th-century Norwegian satirical magazine
 Corsar, a Ukrainian anti-tank missile